William Joseph Ihlenfeld II (born May 5, 1972) is an American attorney and politician from West Virginia.  He is a Democrat. He has served as the United States Attorney for the Northern District of West Virginia since 2021. He previously served in the same capacity under Barack Obama. He was a state senator in the West Virginia Senate for the 1st district from 2018 to 2021.

Education 

Inlenfeld received his Bachelor of Science from the Ohio University and his Juris Doctor from West Virginia University College of Law.

Career 

Ihlenfeld served as an assistant prosecuting attorney for the Brooke County Office of the Prosecuting Attorney from 2007 to 2010 and as an assistant prosecuting attorney and the chief Assistant Prosecutor for the Ohio County Office of the Prosecuting Attorney from 1997 to 2007.

West Virginia Senate
In February 2018, he filed paperwork to run as a candidate for the West Virginia Senate. Ihlenfeld won uncontested in the primary, and faced State Senator Ryan Ferns in the general election. Ihlenfeld and Ferns debated twice throughout the span of their campaigns. On November 7, Ihlenfeld defeated Ferns, 53% - 47%.

U.S. attorney

First term 
On May 27, 2010, he was nominated by President Barack Obama to be the United States attorney for the Northern District of West Virginia. His nomination was reported favorably by the Judiciary Committee on July 29, 2010, and he was confirmed by the United States Senate by voice vote on August 5, 2010. On December 19, 2016, he announced his resignation effective December 31.

In 2017, Ihlenfeld received the Outstanding Service in Law Enforcement Award from the FBI Citizens Academy Alumni Association.

Second term 

On August 10, 2021, President Joe Biden nominated Ihlenfeld to be the United States attorney for the Northern District of West Virginia. His nomination was sent to the United States Senate the same day. On September 30, 2021, his nomination was reported out of committee by voice vote. On October 5, 2021, his nomination was confirmed in the United States Senate by voice vote. He was sworn into office for a second term on October 12, 2021, by Judge Tom Kleeh.

Election results

References

External links
 West Virginia Senate page
 Biography at Bowles Rice

1972 births
Living people
Ohio University alumni
Lawyers from Wheeling, West Virginia
United States Attorneys for the Northern District of West Virginia
West Virginia lawyers
Democratic Party West Virginia state senators
West Virginia University College of Law alumni
21st-century American lawyers
21st-century American politicians
People from Brooke County, West Virginia